Morton Baum may refer to:

 Morton J. Baum (1897–1963), American businessman, president of Hickey Freeman
 Morton Baum (lawyer) (1905–1968), American lawyer, chairman of New York City Center